The Parental Rights in Education act (HB 1557), commonly known as the Don't Say Gay act or the Don't Say Gay or Trans act, is a Florida state law passed in 2022 that regulates public schools in Florida. The act most controversially contains provisions prohibiting public schools from having "classroom discussion" or giving "classroom instruction" about sexual orientation or gender identity from kindergarten through third grade or in any manner deemed to be against state standards in all grades; prohibits public schools from adopting procedures or student support forms that maintain the confidentiality of a disclosure by a student, including that of the gender identity or sexual orientation of a student, from parents; and requires public schools to bear all the costs of all lawsuits filed by aggrieved parents.

The Florida House of Representatives passed the bill on February 24, 2022, in a 69 to 47 vote; with 68 Republicans and 1 Democrat voting for it; and 40 Democrats and 7 Republicans voting against it. The Florida Senate passed the bill on March 8, 2022, in a 22 to 17 vote; with 22 Republicans voting for it; and 15 Democrats and 2 Republicans voting against it. Florida Governor Ron DeSantis, a Republican, signed the bill on March 28, 2022; and the act went into effect on July 1, 2022. The main nationwide organization for LGBT rights in the United States and the main statewide organization for LGBT rights in Florida, the Human Rights Campaign and Equality Florida, respectively, responded by stating that DeSantis had "placed Florida squarely on the wrong side of history" and had "attacked parents and children in our state" by signing the bill.

It has been described as the Don't Say Gay act or as the Don't Say Gay or Trans act by its opponents who oppose the act because it prohibits education about the LGBT community, LGBT history, LGBT rights, and same-sex marriage in early grades or in any manner deemed to be against state standards in all grades; harms children in the classroom; censors classroom discussion about LGBT families by the children of LGBT parents; censors classroom instruction about LGBT families by teachers; forces public schools to out LGBT children against their will to parents who are not accepting of their sexual orientation or gender identity; and erodes the financial resources of public schools by means of frivolous lawsuits by aggrieved parents. LGBT+ parents and families have also joined in calls for the act to be repealed, voicing that the law in combination with other recent pieces of legislation overseen by DeSantis' administration have created a hostile environment in Florida.<ref name=":1"> Numerous other organizations have also released statements criticizing and vowing to challenge the law.

LGBT+ advocacy organizations were joined in their opposition by student protests across both Florida and the US, who have demonstrated against the law through massive walkouts held at middle schools and high schools with large crowds of middle schoolers and high schoolers chanting a variety of slogans such as "We Say Gay". Additional condemnations came from the federal government through the Department of Education and President Biden's office directly, as well as an expert on LGBT+ rights appointed by the United Nations, and 296 major businesses through a joint statement released by the Human Rights Campaign. The most notable corporate opponent to the act was The Walt Disney Company, which came out in opposition after pressure from its employees, and its resulting rebuking of the legislation incited a feud between Disney and DeSantis that precipitated the elimination and eventual takeover of the Reedy Creek Improvement District, the taxation district which houses Walt Disney World. Furthermore, organizations representing teachers, pediatricians, psychologists, and lawyers released statements denouncing the act. Polls on the legislation mostly show plurality or majority opposition to the act or support for the act, but all polls consistently show that support for the act is concentrated among older generations, such as baby boomers, and that opposition to the act is concentrated among younger generations, particularly Generation Z.

Etymology
The act is officially titled the Parental Rights in Education act and is described as "An act relating to parental rights in education" in the act itself.

It is more commonly known as the Don't Say Gay act or as the Don't Say Gay bill, as it has been described in headlines by the prominent news agency, the Associated Press; prominent domestic newspapers such as The New York Times, The Washington Post, and the Los Angeles Times; prominent domestic news media including ABC, CNN, and Fox News;, and prominent foreign news media including ABC (Australia), BBC (Britain), and CBC (Canada).

It is also known as the Don't Say Gay or Trans act or as the Don't Say Gay or Trans bill, as it has been described in statements by the main nationwide organization for LGBT rights in the United States, the Human Rights Campaign; the main statewide organization for LGBT rights in Florida, Equality Florida; and the United Nations official for LGBT rights at the United Nations, the United Nations Independent Expert on Protection against violence and discrimination based on sexual orientation and gender identity.

Debate

Support

The most prominent supporters of the act are Florida Governor Ron DeSantis, a Republican, who signed the bill; Florida Senator Dennis Baxley, a Republican, who filed the bill in the Florida Senate; former Florida Representative Joe Harding, a Republican, who filed the bill in the Florida House of Representatives; Christina Pushaw, who served as press secretary to Florida Governor Ron DeSantis at the time of the passage of the bill; Florida Senator Ileana Garcia, a Republican, who gave a controversial speech in support of the bill; former United States Representative Tulsi Gabbard, a former Democrat, and former President of the United States Donald Trump, a Republican; with several of them either having made false claims reflecting baseless, discredited, and unscientific beliefs about sexual orientation and gender identity, having a consistent record of opposing LGBT rights in the United States, or both.

DeSantis falsely claimed that education for children about gender identity "is trying to sow doubt in kids about their gender identity" and that such education is "trying to say that they can be whatever they want to be", reflecting the baseless, discredited, and unscientific belief that gender identity is a choice that can be changed, contrary to scientific evidence that gender identity is not a choice and cannot be changed. DeSantis has a rating of 0 from the Human Rights Campaign for his voting record on LGBT rights in the United States from the time when he served as a United States Representative; has signed a bill to prohibit transgender girls and transgender women from playing sports for girls and women in Florida, and has opposed the Respect for Marriage Act enacted by the United States Congress that codified the decisions of the Supreme Court of the United States in Loving v. Virginia that led to the nationwide legal recognition of interracial marriage in the United States and Obergefell v. Hodges that led to nationwide legal recognition of same-sex marriage in the United States, saying that there is "no need" for it and that it "absolutely will put religious institutions in difficult spots".

Baxley rhetorically asked, "Why is everybody now all about coming out when you're at school?" and falsely claimed that there are "kids trying on different kinds of things they hear about and different kinds of identities and experimenting. That's what kids do,"  reflecting the baseless, discredited, and unscientific belief that sexual orientation and gender identity are choices that can be changed, contrary to scientific evidence that sexual orientation and gender identity are not choices and cannot be changed. Baxley has opposed same-sex marriage, saying, "I think it's a wake-up call to those who feel like we are redesigning the family in a way that is not good for society," in response to the ruling of the Massachusetts Supreme Judicial Court in Goodridge v. Department of Public Health that led to the legal recognition of same-sex marriage in Massachusetts; has opposed same-sex adoption, stating that, "I simply can't affirm homosexuality. My compass won't go there, knowing what I know biblically,” in voting against a bill that repealed the prohibition on the adoption of children by LGBT parents in Florida that had been ruled unconstitutional by the Florida Third District Court of Appeal in In re Gill that led to the legal recognition of same-sex adoption in Florida; has compared lesbian mothers to abusive fathers, alcoholics, and drug abusers, and categorized lesbian families as "atypical" and "dysfunctional," saying that "this child has got serial men coming through the house, this one has two mommies, this one has an abusive father whose home, this has alcoholism, this one has drug abuse. It was a casualty warfare event to hear -- just her classroom -- how many dysfunctional, atypical -- to me -- uh, structures are in the way of a kid having a chance to learn"; and has compared transgender people to a hypothetical version of himself who believes that he is an automobile, saying, "I can stand out here in the garage all day, convinced that I am an automobile. But it doesn't make me an automobile."

Garcia falsely claimed that "gay is not a permanent thing, LGBT is not a permanent thing", reflecting the baseless, discredited, and unscientific belief that sexual orientation and gender identity are choices that can be changed, contrary to scientific evidence that sexual orientation and gender identity are not choices and cannot be changed. Garcia later apologized for her false claim.

Pushaw falsely claimed that "The bill that liberals inaccurately call ‘Don’t Say Gay’ would be more accurately described as an Anti-Grooming Bill," and falsely claimed that "If you’re against the Anti-Grooming bill, you are probably a groomer or at least you don’t denounce the grooming of 4-8 year old children,"  reflecting the baseless, discredited, and unscientific belief and anti-LGBT conspiracy theory that people who protect LGBT children and teachers who educate children about the LGBT community, LGBT history, LGBT rights, and same-sex marriage are practicing a form of child grooming, contrary to scientific research by experts in child development and psychology that indicate that the aforementioned education has a positive effect on children. Dr. Jenifer McGuire, PhD, MPH, a professor in the department of family social science at the University of Minnesota stated that the false claims of Christina Pushaw and others making similar false claims stems "from an underlying desire to separate people who are different and to characterize them as less than or as evil. So it’s a new form of homophobia and transphobia — or it’s maybe the same old form but with new language".

Gabbard argued that the act should cover not only kindergarten through to third grade, but all grades through to twelfth grade. Gabbard has opposed efforts to protect gay children from bullying and harassment in public schools in Hawaii, claiming that "the problem we were led to believe exists in our schools — that there is rampant anti-gay harassment — simply does not exist"; has opposed civil unions for same-sex couples in Hawaii, saying "As Democrats, we should be representing the views of the people, not a small number of homosexual extremists"; has opposed same-sex marriage in Hawaii, saying, when asked "What qualifies you to be a state representative?", "Working with my father, Mike Gabbard, and others to pass a constitutional amendment" to grant the Hawaii State Legislature the authority to prohibit same-sex marriage in Hawaii; and has touted working for the Alliance for Traditional Marriage and Values, an organization run by her father, Mike Gabbard, which opposed same-sex marriage in Hawaii and promoted the discredited, harmful, and pseudoscientific practice of conversion therapy.

Trump agreed with DeSantis signing the bill, calling it "a good move" in an interview with The Washington Post, though he reportedly declined to elaborate. Trump has opposed the Equality Act proposed in the United States Congress, which would codify the decision of the Supreme Court of the United States in Bostock v. Clayton County that led to the recognition of sexual orientation and gender identity as protected classes in Title VII of the Civil Rights Act of 1964 and extend it to all sections of the Civil Rights Act of 1964; has appointed federal judges opposed to LGBT rights in the United States; banned transgender servicemembers from serving the in United States Armed Forces; and has executed various other actions against LGBT rights in the United States.

Opposition
The most prominent opponents of the act are students (both LGBT students and non-LGBT students alike), parents (both LGBT parents and non-LGBT parents alike), families (both LGBT families and non-LGBT families alike), the Family Equality Council, the American Federation of Teachers, the National Education Association, the Florida Education Association, the American Academy of Pediatrics, the American Psychological Association, the Human Rights Campaign, Equality Florida, Human Rights Watch, the United States (represented by the Federal Government of the United States, including the President of the United States and the United States Secretary of Education), the United Nations (represented by the United Nations Independent Expert on Protection against violence and discrimination based on sexual orientation and gender identity), the American Bar Association, and 296 major businesses, including, most notably and most prominently, The Walt Disney Company.

Massive walkouts were carried out by students in middle schools and high schools across Florida and throughout the United States in opposition to what they described as the Don't Say Gay bill, with large crowds of middle schoolers and high schoolers chanting "We Say Gay", "Gay Lives Matter", "We Fight For Gay Rights", and "Hey Hey, Ho Ho, Homophobes Have Got To Go" in response. Tristan Schwiethale, a sixth grade student who organized the walkout at Islander Middle School in Mercer Island, Washington, stated that "As soon as I looked at the bill, I knew it shouldn’t be passed. [...] I personally am gay and I have always been able to openly talk about my sexuality and gender identity in schools. The fact [that] some kids will not be able to is not OK". Kyungsup Hwang, an eighth grade student who organized the walkout at Gunston Middle School in Arlington, Virginia, stated that the bill "censors teachers and students alike". Will Larkins, an eleventh grade student who organized the walkout at Winter Park High School in Winter Park, Florida stated that "We wanted to show our government that this isn’t going to stop. There were walkouts all last week. This is going to continue. If this passes, there will be protests everywhere". Jack Petocz, a twelfth grade student who organized the walkout at Flagler Palm Coast High School in Palm Coast, Florida, stated that "The language and the supporters of the bill and the rhetoric around the bill really shows what this bill is".

The Family Equality Council stated that the act attempts to "erase for an entire generation of Florida public school students" education about the LGBT community, LGBT history, LGBT rights, and same-sex marriage; and stated that the act violates the First Amendment to the United States Constitution and the Fourteenth Amendment to the United States Constitution "by discriminatorily censoring classroom instruction about sexual orientation or gender identity in Florida public schools".

The American Federation of Teachers, the National Education Association, and the Florida Education Association oppose the act because it harms LGBT children in public schools in Florida. Randi Weingarten, the President of the American Federation of Teachers, stated that the act would "single out certain kids and families for derision and denigration. It is just wrong. Its intent is to divide our communities". Becky Pringle, the President of the National Education Association, stated that "This deeply disturbing legislation aims to censor educators and prevent them from valuing, affirming and supporting our students because of their sexual orientation or gender identity". Andrew Spar, the President of the Florida Education Association, stated that the act would "mean some of our students will no longer feel safe and secure, or even seen, based on who they are".

The American Academy of Pediatrics and the American Psychological Association oppose the act because it harms children. Dr. Lisa Gwynn, DO, MBA, MSPH, FAAP, the President of the Florida Chapter of the American Academy of Pediatrics at the time of the passage of bill, stated that "The ‘Don’t Say Gay’ bill will harm Florida’s children in the classroom and beyond". Dr. Frank C. Worrell, PhD, the President of the American Psychological Association at the time of the passage of the bill, stated that the act is "stigmatizing and marginalizing children" and that the act "sends a damaging message to impressionable young people at a critical time in their development".

The Human Rights Campaign, Equality Florida, and Human Rights Watch oppose the act because it harms LGBT children in public schools in Florida. Joni Madison, the Interim President of the Human Rights Campaign at the time of the passage of the bill, in response to the signing of the bill by Florida Governor Ron DeSantis, stated that "Governor DeSantis once again placed Florida squarely on the wrong side of history, and placed his own young constituents directly in harm's way". Nadine Smith, Executive Director of Equality Florida, in response to the signing of the bill by Florida Governor Ron DeSantis, stated that "Governor Ron DeSantis signed the 'Don't Say Gay' bill in the most cowardly way possible today. He hid his agenda from the media and the public until the last moment, skulking onto a charter school campus that is exempt from the law and away from students who would protest his presence. He has attacked parents and children in our state". Ryan Thoreson, a Specialist at the Lesbian, Gay, Bisexual, and Transgender Rights Program at Human Rights Watch, stated that the act would "chill open discussions and support for lesbian, gay, bisexual, and transgender (LGBT) students".

The Federal Government of the United States opposes the act because it harms LGBT children, LGBT educators, and LGBT families. Karine Jean-Pierre, the White House Press Secretary, on behalf of Joe Biden, the President of the United States, stated that it meant that "some of Florida’s most vulnerable students and families are more fearful and less free". Dr. Miguel Cardona, the United States Secretary of Education, stated "I worry about its effects on young people and families in the state" and that "it put Florida students in danger of bullying and worse mental health outcomes".

The United Nations opposes the act and other similar acts that have been passed or proposed because it harms LGBT children in public schools in the United States. Victor Madrigal-Borloz, the United Nations Independent Expert on Protection against violence and discrimination based on sexual orientation and gender identity stated that "The recent wave of “Don’t Say Gay or Trans” laws that passed in several states, among them Florida and Alabama, with similar proposals in many other states, restrict teachers and staff from discussing LGBT issues at school and can have the impact of endorsing exclusion, bullying, and harassment of LGBT youth in American education settings".

The American Bar Association opposes the act and other similar acts because it harms LGBT children at school. Reginald Turner, the President of the American Bar Association at the time of the passage of the bill, stated that the acts "foster a hostile culture beset by bullying and physical violence" against LGBT children at school.

296 major businesses oppose the act and others similar acts that have been passed or proposed that have the impact of restricting the rights of LGBT people, because it harms LGBT children and LGBT families as well as LGBT people who are their employees and customers. The major businesses noted in a statement that the acts target LGBT children for "for exclusion or differential treatment", that the acts "would harm our team members and their families, stripping them of opportunities and making them feel unwelcome and at risk in their own communities. As such, it can be exceedingly difficult for us to recruit the most qualified candidates for jobs in states" that have passed such acts, and that the acts "have a negative effect on our employees, our customers, our competitiveness, and state and national economies". Some of the companies or North American divisions of companies which signed the letter include but are not limited to most major American media conglomerates (including the holding companies for NBC, ABC, and CBS), large technology companies like Apple and Google, the oil giant Shell, automakers General Motors and Toyota, large banks such as Wells Fargo and HSBC, transportation companies like American Airlines and Union Pacific Railroad, retailers PetSmart and CVS, and healthcare firms AstraZeneca and Cardinal Health.

The Walt Disney Company opposes the act because it harms LGBT children and LGBT families. Bob Chapek, the Chief Executive Officer of The Walt Disney Company at the time of the passage of bill, stated that the act "could be used to unfairly target gay, lesbian, non-binary and transgender kids and families". Bob Iger, the former Chief Executive Officer of The Walt Disney Company at time of the passage of the bill and the current Chief Executive Officer of The Walt Disney Company, stated that "To me, it wasn’t about politics. It is about what is right and what is wrong, and that just seemed wrong. It seemed potentially harmful to kids" and that "When you’re dealing with right and wrong or when you’re dealing with something that does have profound impact on your business, I just think you have to do what is right and not worry about the potential backlash to it".

Legislative history
Florida Senator Dennis Baxley filed Senate Bill 1834, Parental Rights in Education, in the Florida Senate on January 7, 2022, but it died in the Florida Senate Appropriations Committee. Former Florida Representative Joe Harding filed House Bill 1557, Parental Rights in Education, in the Florida House of Representatives on January 11, 2022, which was passed by the Florida Legislature.

The Florida House of Representatives passed the bill on February 24, 2022, in a 69 to 47 vote; with 68 Republicans and 1 Democrat voting for it; and 40 Democrats and 7 Republicans voting against it. The 1 Democrat who voted for it was James Bush; and the 7 Republicans who voted against were Vance Aloupis, Demi Busatta Cabrera, Chip LaMarca, Amber Mariano, Jim Mooney, Rene Plasencia, and Will Robinson.

The Florida Senate passed the bill on March 8, 2022, in a 22 to 17 vote; with 22 Republicans voting for it; and 15 Democrats and 2 Republicans voting against it. The 2 Republicans who voted against it were Jeff Brandes and Jennifer Bradley.

Florida Governor Ron DeSantis signed the bill on March 28, 2022; and the act went into effect on July 1, 2022.

The act prohibits public schools from having "classroom discussion" or giving "classroom instruction" about sexual orientation or gender identity from kindergarten through third grade or in any manner deemed to be against state standards in all grades; prohibits public schools from adopting procedures or student support forms that maintain the confidentiality of a disclosure by a student, including the confidentiality of a disclosure by a student of their sexual orientation or gender identity, from parents; prohibits public schools from preventing parents from accessing the education and health records of students; and requires public schools to bear the costs of all lawsuits filed by aggrieved parents.

Polling
Polls have variously shown plurality or majority opposition to the act or support for the act; with results varying depending on the sample size of the poll, the wording of the poll, and the polling firm that conducted the poll; whereas all polls have consistently shown that support for the act is concentrated among older generations, particularly the Baby Boomer Generation or Boomers, and that opposition to the act is concentrated among younger generations, particularly Generation Z or Zoomers.
 A Ipsos poll found that 62% of Americans oppose legislation prohibiting classroom lessons about sexual orientation and gender identity in elementary schools and 37% support such legislation.
 A University of Florida poll found that 49% of Florida voters oppose the act and 40% support it.
 A Morning Consult poll found that 50% of American registered voters support the act and 34% oppose it.
 A Siena College Research Institute poll found that 50% of Florida likely voters oppose the act and 44% support it.

Aftermath

The Walt Disney Company

Employees at The Walt Disney Company planned walkouts over the bill, which culminated in a large protest. The company and CEO Bob Chapek (despite earlier maintaining no stance), as well as Disney heir Charlee Corra all decided to publicly oppose the bill, with Corra also using the moment to come out as transgender. The company received heavy criticism from DeSantis and many conservative media outlets for its opposition to the bill.

Lawsuits
On March 31, a lawsuit was filed in federal court by law firm Kaplan Hecker and Fink, the National Center for Lesbian Rights, and public attorney Elizabeth F. Schwartz on behalf of Equality Florida and Family Equality, which sought to block the bill on the grounds that it was unconstitutional. The lawsuit alleged that the bill violates the constitutionally protected rights of free speech, equal protection and due process of students and families, and argued that the bill was an effort to "control young minds" which prevented students from living "their true identities in school".

On July 26, Florida high school student Will Larkins and the national LGBT+ organization CenterLink, through the Southern Poverty Law Center, Southern Legal Counsel, and Lambda Legal, filed suit against four Florida school districts' boards (those of the Orange County Public Schools, the School District of Palm Beach County, the School District of Indian River County, and the Duval County Public Schools), claiming the law's "vigilante enforcement mechanism," combined with its "intentionally vague and sweeping scope, invites parents who oppose any acknowledgement whatsoever of the existence of LGBTQ+ people to sue, resulting in schools acting aggressively to silence students, parents, and school personnel." A representative for Duval County stated that the school administration "will always take steps necessary to comply with Florida laws."  In October 2022, federal judge Wendy Berger dismissed the suit, for lack of standing, which challenged the legislation effective since July 1. She gave the plaintiffs 14 days to file a revised lawsuit.

New York City
In response to the passage of the act, New York City mayor Eric Adams launched an eight-week advertising campaign in five major Florida cities denouncing the act, while celebrating the level of LGBT acceptance in NYC. Funds for the campaign were donated, not sourced from taxpayers.

Subsequent Florida bills

HB 1069 
House Bill 1069, Education, was filed on February 22, 2023, by Republican state representative Stan McClain. Seen as an extension of the Parental Rights in Education act, the bill would only allow grades 6 to 12 in public schools to receive sex education. Provisions within the bill also require that sex education classes in Florida teach that “sex is determined by biology and reproductive function at birth", and that reproductive gender roles are "binary, stable, and unchangeable.”

HB 1223 
House Bill 1223, Public PreK-12 Educational Institution and Instruction Requirements, was filed on February 28, 2023, by Republican state representative Adam Anderson. The bill was seen as an expansion of the Parental Rights in Education act, and includes a variety of measures, including an extension of the prohibition to eighth grade, enacting a statewide definition of “sex” as “the binary division of individuals based upon reproductive function” and “an immutable biological trait", and prohibiting schools from requiring people to use a pronoun or title for someone if they don’t correspond to a person’s assigned sex at birth.

SB 1320 
Senate Bill 1320, Child Protection in Public Schools, was filed on March 1, 2023, by Republican state senator Clay Yarborough. The senate bill contains many of the same provisions as house bills 1223 and 1069, and also restricts school employees from sharing their pronouns and asking students about their pronouns. It would also prohibit teaching about sexual orientation or gender identity from pre-kindergarten through the eighth grade. DeSantis has already made comments supporting the bill, signaling that if it passes the legislature, he will likely sign it.

Other non-Floridian bills

Federal bills
Republican Representative Mike Johnson of Louisiana introduced the Stop the Sexualization of Children Act, a version of the bill in the US House of Representatives titled the which has gained 32 GOP cosponsors. The bill is argued by its critics to not only replicate but go further than the Parental Rights in Education Act, as it would prohibit LGBTQ material in all federal facilities, prohibit drag performances in all federally-funded institutions, and similar to the Texas Heartbeat Act, include a private right of action clause enabling parents and guardians to sue institutions which hold such performances.

State bills
At least 20 states have had their legislatures introduce derivative bills of the Parental Rights in Education Act, including Arizona, Georgia, Iowa, Kentucky, Louisiana, Missouri, Ohio, Oklahoma, Tennessee, and South Carolina. In April 2022, Alabama became the second state to pass a similar bill, with governor Kay Ivey signing House Bill 322, legislation which additionally requires all students to use either male or female bathrooms in Alabama public schools based on their biological sex. It is noted that some states have had similar provisions to Florida's law since the 1980s, though they have never gained the name of "Don't Say Gay" bills by critics until recently.

Notes

References

Further reading
 Sosin, Kate (April 20, 2022). ‘Don’t Say Gay’ bills aren’t new. They’ve just been revived. The 19th. Retrieved April 27, 2022.

External links
 Source Text from the Florida Senate

2022 in Florida
2022 in American law
2022 in LGBT history
2022 controversies in the United States
LGBT in Florida
Florida law
LGBT-related controversies in the United States
United States education law
LGBT law in the United States
Censorship of LGBT issues
Discrimination against LGBT people in the United States
Censorship in the United States
Ron DeSantis
Florida statutes